Kenati may refer to:
 Kenati language, an East New Guinea Highlands language
 Kenati Technologies, an embedded device software company acquired by 2Wire in October 2007
 Mohammed-Benba-Kenâti, a notable leader of the Soninke Wangara clans in Mali